Cristina-Andreea Mitu (born 22 September 1991) is a professional tennis player from Romania.

On 8 June 2015, she achieved her career-high singles ranking of 68, and her best doubles ranking is world No. 69, reached on 24 October 2016. Mitu is a member of the Romania Fed Cup team. On 19 April 2015, she beat then-ranked world No. 7, Eugenie Bouchard, in a Fed Cup match, in three sets.

Personal life and background
She is coached by Adrian Marcu. Her parents are Petre and Ania. She also has a brother named Alex, who is a soccer player. She has an aggressive style of play. Andreea's favorite surface is hard (but loves grass too), while her favorite shot is forehand. She started playing tennis at age 7. Her tennis idols growing up were Jelena Dokic, Patty Schnyder, Williams sisters, Jennifer Capriati and Martina Hingis. She also enjoys shopping, hanging out with friends and getting nails done. She stated that if weren't a tennis player, she would be a lawyer. In 2018, she gave birth to a son named Adam.

WTA career

2015-16: 4th round at Roland Garros
Not having won a single WTA Tour title, Mitu made it to the fourth round of 2015 French Open defeating world No. 12, Karolína Plíšková, in the second round, and former champion Francesca Schiavone in the third round. After this performance, Mitu rose to a career-high ranking of 68.

In 2016, Mitu won two WTA Tour titles: in April the İstanbul Cup, and in July the Swedish Open.

2017-18: Motherhood and third WTA title
In 2017, Mitu took a break from competition: In January 2018, she became mother of a boy. In July 2018, she won the Bucharest Open doubles title partnering Irina-Camelia Begu, marking her overall third doubles title.

2019-21: Second and third round at majors
In 2020, she reached third round at Roland Garros, with Patricia Tig, and in 2021, she reached second round at Melbourne, with Raluca Olaru - her best major doubles results so far.

Performance timelines

Singles

Doubles

WTA career finals

Doubles: 5 (4 titles, 1 runner-up)

WTA 125 tournament finals

Doubles: 1 (1 title)

ITF Circuit finals

Singles: 32 (19 titles, 13 runner–ups)

Doubles: 32 (21 titles, 11 runner–ups)

Head-to-head record

Record against top 10 players
Mitu's win–loss record against certain players who have been ranked world No. 10 or higher is as follows:

Top 10 wins

Notes

References

External links

 
 
 
 
 

1991 births
Living people
Tennis players from Bucharest
Romanian female tennis players
Olympic tennis players of Romania
Tennis players at the 2016 Summer Olympics
21st-century Romanian women